The Fogo (Island) Super Cup (Portuguese: Super Taça do Fogo, Capeverdean Creole: ALUPEK: Super Tasa du Fogu, Fogo Creole: Super Taça du Fogu) is a regional super cup competition played during the season in the island of Fogo, Cape Verde. The competition is organized by the Fogo Regional Football Association (Associação Regional de Futebol do Fogo, ARFF). Its current champions is Vulcânicos who won their second title, which was their next in a decade. The regional champion competes with the cup champion. If a champion also has a cup title, a cup club who is runner-up qualifies. The upcoming super cup will feature the champion Vulcânicos and the cup winner Académica do Fogo.

Several cancellations occurred including in 2010 and in 2011 where a cup runner up withdrew, it was canceled in 2014 and 2015, the time when Pico do Fogo on the nearby island to the west was erupting, it delayed the regional championships for a month and smaller delays occurred up to the start of 2017 and canceled the regional cup competition for 2015.  The 2016 edition was undecided along with the cup final, one entrant would be the champion Vulcânicos.

Winners

1Runner up in the cup final as the regional cup winner was also the regional champion that season

See also
Fogo Island Cup
Fogo Premier Division
Fogo Opening Tournament

Notes

References

Sport in Fogo, Cape Verde
Football cup competitions in Cape Verde
2002 establishments in Cape Verde